Halt may refer to:

 Halt (railway), a small railway station
 HLT (x86 instruction), aka "HALT"
 Highly accelerated life test, a product stress testing methodology
 The Halt, a 2019 film
 Charles I. Halt (born 1939), United States Air Force colonel who had an encounter with UFOs
 Karl Ritter von Halt, born Karl Ferdinand Halt (1891–1964), sport official in Nazi Germany and in the German Federal Republic

See also

 
 
 Stop (disambiguation)